Clement House is a building on the eastern edge of Aldwych, London. Designed by Scottish architect John James Burnet, the building was constructed in 1909–1910 as the London headquarters of the General Accident, Fire & Life Assurance Company. It was purchased by the London School of Economics in 1993 and subsequently converted into a teaching building.

See also 
 32 Lincoln's Inn Fields

References 

London School of Economics